Ab Gandu (also Romanized as Āb Gandū, Ab Gandoo, and Āb Gandow) is a village in Haparu Rural District, in the Central District of Bagh-e Malek County, Khuzestan Province, Iran. At the 2006 census, its population was 391, in 69 families.

References 

Populated places in Bagh-e Malek County